Yoann Poulard (born 1 July 1976 in Saint-Nazaire) is a former French footballer who played in the position of right defender.

External links
 Picture and Profile
 
 
 
 

1976 births
Living people
French footballers
Stade Brestois 29 players
FC Nantes players
Le Mans FC players
AC Ajaccio players
Ligue 1 players
Ligue 2 players
Angers SCO players
Sportspeople from Saint-Nazaire
Association football defenders
Footballers from Loire-Atlantique